Administrative divisions of medieval Serbia refer to regional administrative divisions of Medieval Serbia, from the 7th to the 15 the century.

Serbian Principality and Principality of Duklja
The Byzantine Empire called the lands of the South Slavs "Sclaviniaes" (from the Sclaveni, the Southwestern branch), and they were initially outside Imperial control. By the second half of the 7th century, most of the Slavs in proximity to Byzantium had recognized the Emperor's supreme rule.

The prince (archon) that led the Serbs to the Balkans and received the protection of Heraclius (r. 610–641), known conventionally as the Unknown Archont, was an ancestor of the Vlastimirović dynasty. The Serbs at that time were organized into župe, a confederation of village communities (roughly the equivalent of a county), headed by a local župan (a magistrate or governor). According to Fine, the governorship was hereditary, and the župan reported to the Serbian prince, whom they were obliged to aid in war. Emperor Constantine VII Porphyrogenitus (r. 913–959) mentions that the Serbian throne is inherited by the son, i.e. the first-born, though in one occasion there is a triumvirate in his enumeration of monarchs.

Višeslav, the first Serbian monarch known by name, was a contemporary with Charlemagne (fl. 768–814). He directly held the hereditary lands of Neretva, Tara, Piva and Lim. Radoslav, then Prosigoj, succeeded Višeslav, and they ruled during the revolt of Ljudevit Posavski against the Franks (819–822). According to the Royal Frankish Annals, written in 822, Ljudevit went from his seat at Sisak to the Serbs somewhere in western Balkans, "who are said to hold a great/large part of Dalmatia" (ad Sorabos, quae natio magnam Dalmatiae partem obtinere dicitur).

The Serbs established several future principalities by the 10th century: Serbia (roughly the later province of Rascia, including Bosnia; part of Zagorje - "hinterlands"); and Pagania, Zachlumia, Travunia (including Kanalitai) and Dioclea (part of Pomorje - "maritime").

Serbian Grand Principality

Luška
Budva
Onogošt
Oblik
Ribnica
Ston
Popovo
Dubrava
Luka
Dabar
Žapska
Gorička
Večenik
Trebinje
Urmo
Konavlje
Risan
Rudina
Ras
Drina
Patkovo
Hvosno
Podrimlje
Toplica
Ibar
Rasina
West Morava
Dubočica
Kostrc
Draškovina
Sitnica
Lab
Lipljan
Glbočica
Reke
Uska
Pomoravlje
Zagrlata
Levče
Belica
Lim
Kujavča
Zatrnava
Raban
Pilot

Serbian Empire

Fall of the Serbian Empire

References

Sources
Primary sources
 
 
 
 
 
 

Secondary sources

External links